Deer berry is a common name for several plants and may refer to:

Gaultheria procumbens
Maianthemum dilatatum, native to western North America
Mitchella repens, native to North America
Vaccinium stamineum, native to North America